Yermolovka is a rural locality (a selo) in Pochepskoye Rural Settlement, Liskinsky District, Voronezh Oblast, Russia. The population was 689 as of 2010. There are 7 streets.

Geography 
Yermolovka is located 27 km north of Liski (the district's administrative centre) by road. Voznesenovka is the nearest rural locality.

References 

Rural localities in Liskinsky District